Santa Maria de Serrateix  is the Romanesque church of a former Benedictine abbey located on the BV-4235 road in Serrateix in the comarca of Berguedà, Catalonia.

History
The monastery dates to c. 940 when a group of monks settled in the area. From 977, it came under the protection of the Counts of Cerdanya and Besalú while Froila became the abbot (977-993). Housing 13 monks, it later received donations from Oliba Cabreta (whose sarcophagus lies here) and his brother Miró. A new church built in 1077 was consecrated in 1126. In the fourteenth century, while only six monks were living there, the bell tower was destroyed but was rebuilt under the abbot Berenguer de Lluçà in 1373. The monastery later came under the authority of the Bishop of Urgell.

The church was rebuilt in the Neoclassical style between 1798 and 1827. The monastery was also transformed in the Neoclassical style by the architect Josep Torrevedella, the work being completed in 1793. The buildings suffered considerable damage during the Spanish Civil War that destroyed several monastic dependencies. The tomb of Abbot Berenguer de Torigues was declared a Bien de Interés Cultural monument in 1982, now preserved in the Museu Diocesà i Comarcal de Solsona. Santa Maria de Serrateix became a Bien de Interés Cultural site in its own right on 1 June 1999.

References

Further reading
  Bolòs, Jordi, Diplomatari del monestir de Santa Maria de Serrateix (segles X-XV), Fundació Noguera, Barcelona, 2006. .
 (related the abbey and Ado of Vienna)

External links
Monasterio de Santa Maria de Serrateix with several photographs 

Benedictine monasteries in Catalonia
Bien de Interés Cultural landmarks in the Province of Barcelona
Christian monasteries established in the 10th century
Romanesque architecture in Catalonia
10th-century establishments in Spain
Religious buildings and structures completed in 940